Gordon Johnson (born 1 August 1946) is an Australian former cyclist. He competed at the 1964 Summer Olympics and the 1968 Summer Olympics. Despite being an Australian he became the British track champion, winning the British National Individual Sprint Championships in 1971.

References

External links
 

1946 births
Living people
Australian male cyclists
Olympic cyclists of Australia
Cyclists at the 1964 Summer Olympics
Cyclists at the 1968 Summer Olympics
Cyclists from Melbourne
UCI Track Cycling World Champions (men)
Commonwealth Games medallists in cycling
Commonwealth Games gold medallists for Australia
Commonwealth Games silver medallists for Australia
Australian track cyclists
Cyclists at the 1970 British Commonwealth Games
Sport Australia Hall of Fame inductees
20th-century Australian people
21st-century Australian people
People from Essendon, Victoria
Medallists at the 1970 British Commonwealth Games